The 2010–11 Lega Basket Serie A was the 89th season of the Lega Basket Serie A, the top level basketball league in Italy. The season from October 16, 2010 till June 19, 2011. Montepaschi Siena won its 6th title.

Teams
Air Avellino
Angelico Biella
Armani Jeans Milano
Banca Tercas Teramo
Benetton Treviso
Bennet Cantù
Canadian Solar Bologna
Cimberio Varese
Dinamo Sassari
Enel Brindisi
Fabi Shoes Montegranaro
Lottomatica Roma
Montepaschi Siena
Pepsi Caserta
Scavolini Siviglia Pesaro
Vanoli-Braga Cremona

Regular season

Standings

Play-offs

References

Lega Basket Serie A seasons
1
Italy